Carlos Francisco Cáceres Contreras (born 7 October 1940) is a Chilean economist who served as minister of Augusto Pinochet.

References

1940 births
Living people
20th-century Chilean politicians
20th-century Chilean economists
Pontifical Catholic University of Valparaíso alumni
Cornell University alumni
Harvard University alumni
People from Valparaíso
Chilean Ministers of Finance
Chilean Ministers of the Interior